The 2018 Roller Derby World Cup was the third international women's Roller Derby World Cup, taking place on February 1–4 at EventCity, in Manchester, United Kingdom, with 38 teams competing. An international roller derby tournament, it was organised by a committee consisting of ten representatives from various areas of the roller derby community.

Some teams selected their skaters as early as October 2016, when the tournament was expected to be held in 2017.

USA Roller Derby successfully defended their title, defeating Team Australia in the final.

Participating teams
Teams representing 38 countries  participated. While most national teams are representing a country in the conventional sense, the members of Team Indigenous comprise skaters of Indigenous heritage from Canada, the United States, Argentina, New Zealand and Samoa. The Korean team does not specify North or South Korea in its name.
List of teams

 (as Aotearoa)

 Indigenous
 (as IRN)

 (as ZA)

Tournament structure
The tournament ran on four tracks over four days, with an opening round of short, 30-minute games on the first day to determine seedings for the second and third days, via a ranking algorithm. 
The second and third days saw two additional games for each team (for a total of four games guaranteed for all participants), resulting in a final rating and ranking by the same algorithm. The top eight teams in that ranking proceeded to an 8-way elimination tournament, with losing teams playing additional games for final ranking. The teams in positions ninth through sixteenth played one additional game for final ranking. (This system is essentially, a modified Swiss-system tournament for the first three days, with strengths for matchings derived from a power ranking, and Fontes-style matching of multiple games between recalculation of strengths.)

Ranking Round

Blue Round

Pink Round

Yellow Round

Green Round

Knockout stage

Quarter-finals

Classification games for 5th-8th place

Semi-finals

Final classification games

Match for 15th place

Match for 13th place

Match for 11th place

Match for 9th place

Match for 7th place

Match for 5th place

Third place play-off

Final

Tournament team rankings

Exhibition matches
In addition to competition matches, three exhibition matches were played during the tournament.

International Juniors Expo

Broadcast
The entire weekend was broadcast online via pay-per-view streaming, and the tournament's fourth day was additionally carried on BBC Sport.

References

External links
 Official website

Roller Derby World Cup
Roller Derby World Cup
Sports competitions in Manchester
2010s in Manchester